The Minotaur-class  ironclads consisted of three armoured frigates built for the Royal Navy during the 1860s. The ships of this class were unique among ironclad warships in possessing on completion five masts, named fore-, second-, main-, fourth- and mizzen-.

History
They were originally intended to mount forty Armstrong 110-pounder breech-loading guns on the main deck, with ten more on pivot mountings on the upper deck. The failure of these guns in service led to a complete re-evaluation of their armament, with a concomitant delay in the arming of the whole class. The ships were armed with a combination of 9-inch muzzle-loading rifles (MLR) on metal carriages and 7-inch MLRs on rope-worked carriages. In a moderate swell these 7-inch guns were virtually unworkable, making the Minotaurs both the heaviest and the worst armed of the Victorian battleships.

They were, in spite of the number of masts they exhibited, the most sluggish of all British ironclads under sail. They were regarded as good sea-boats, and were considered to be among the steadiest ships in the battle-fleet. They were slow in manoeuvre under hand-steering, but were regarded as good after steam steering was fitted.

Notes

References
 
 
 
 
 
 

 
Ship classes of the Royal Navy